This list includes awards and nominations of film and stage actor Robert De Niro. There is information about his awards and nominations for films and also for awards for his stage work. There is a list of special awards received such as the Lifetime Achievement Award or Man of the Year.

An eight-time Academy Award nominee, De Niro won two Oscars for playing Vito Corleone in The Godfather Part II (1974) and Jake LaMotta in Raging Bull (1980). He is also a six-time BAFTA Award nominee, and an eight-time Golden Globe Award nominee. In 2009, he was among the five recipients of the Kennedy Center Honors, presented by 44th President of the United States Barack Obama.

Major associations

Academy Awards

British Academy Film Awards

Golden Globe Awards

Primetime Emmy Awards

Screen Actors Guild Awards

Miscellaneous awards

Australian Academy of Cinema Awards

American Comedy Awards

American Movie Awards

Berlin International Film Festival

Blockbuster Entertainment Awards

Boston Society of Film Critics

Christopher Award

Critics' Choice Awards

Detroit Film Critics Society

Los Angeles Film Critics Association

MTV Movie Awards

National Board of Review

National Society of Film Critics

New York Film Critics Circle

Satellite Awards

Saturn Awards

Special awards

Other honors

This list includes ranks and honors given by websites, channels or magazines:

References

Sources
 
 

Lists of awards received by American actor
Robert De Niro